The Kam Wah Chung & Co. Museum, also known as Kam Wah Chung Company Building, is a state park and a National Historic Landmark that preserves early Chinese culture in John Day in the U.S. state of Oregon.  Built in the 1870s, possibly as a trading post, it is the best-preserved example of a Chinese herbal apothecary and mercantile establishment dating to the post-Civil War period of growth in the Western United States.

History
The Kam Wah Chung Company Building was built along a wagon road later known as The Dalles Military Road, possibly as a trading post serving placer mining operations on Canyon Creek.  By 1878, it was under lease to the Kam Wah Chung Company, which was purchased in 1887 by the partnership of Ing Hay (known also as "Doc Hay") and Lung On, Chinese immigrants from Canton.

The building remained abandoned after Ing Hay died in 1952.  He asked that the building be deeded to the city of John Day with the provision it be turned into a museum.  His wish, and the ownership of the building, were forgotten until 1967.  While surveying for a new park the city discovered its ownership of the building and began to restore it as it was in the 1940s.  The city also has custody of many of the company's records and personal documents relating to the proprietors.

Currently the Kam Wah Chung & Co. Museum contains one of the most extensive collections of materials from the century-long influx of Chinese immigrants in the American West.  It was listed on the National Register of Historic Places in 1973 and designated a National Historic Landmark by the Secretary of the Interior in 2005.

The museum received particular attention from Oregon First Lady Mary Oberst, wife of Governor Ted Kulongoski, who helped raise $1.5 million in private funds to renovate the building into a state park. The renovation began in November 2006 and was re-opened in August 2007. The renovated museum's grand re-opening was celebrated on May 3, 2008.

See also
 List of Oregon state parks
 List of National Historic Landmarks in Oregon
 National Register of Historic Places listings in Grant County, Oregon

References

External links
 
 
 
 Kam Wah Chung Documentary produced by Oregon Public Broadcasting

National Historic Landmarks in Oregon
Chinese-American history
Chinese-American museums
Chinese-American culture in Oregon
Museums in Grant County, Oregon
State parks of Oregon
Ethnic museums in Oregon
Parks in Grant County, Oregon
National Register of Historic Places in Grant County, Oregon
John Day, Oregon